Broomella is a genus of fungi in the family Sporocadaceae.

Fungal genera Broomella and Hyalotiella are poorly known genera in the formerly known Amphisphaeriaceae (now the Sporocadaceae family). Both types of genera are known from their morphological descriptions. Three collections of fungi were made from dead twigs of Clematis species in Italy, and two from Spartium species and were later identified using LSU gene data as Broomella and Hyalotiella species. Specifically Broomella vitalbae and Hyalotiella spartii.

Species
As accepted by Species Fungorum;

Broomella acuta 
Broomella annulata 
Broomella chlorina 
Broomella excelsa 
Broomella leptogiicola 
Broomella montaniensis 
Broomella phyllocharis 
Broomella pustulata 
Broomella ravenelii 
Broomella rosae 
Broomella tianshanica 
Broomella verrucosa 
Broomella vitalbae 
Broomella zeae 

Former species;
 B. ichnaspidis  = Oomyces ichnaspidis, Acrospermaceae
 B. ichnaspidis var. major  = Oomyces ichnaspidis, Acrospermaceae
 B. lagerheimii  = Allonecte lagerheimii, Tubeufiaceae
 B. miakei  = Puttemansia miakei, Tubeufiaceae
 B. munkii  = Uleodothis munkii, Venturiaceae
 B. rickiana  = Phragmosperma rickianum, Massarinaceae

References

External links
Index Fungorum

Amphisphaeriales